Underbart is the twelfth studio album by Arvingarna, released on 25 November 2009.

Track listing

Contributors
strings: Mattias Bylund
violin: Mattias Johansson
Viola: Irene Bylund
Cello: David Bukovinszky

Charts

References 

2009 albums
Arvingarna albums